The Pacific Coast Biscuit Company was a conglomerate of baking companies headquartered in Portland, Oregon, United States. The company, also known as Pacific Coast, was formed in 1899, and it was purchased by the National Biscuit Company in 1930. It was the only baking company in the United States to trademark a swastika.

History
In the late 19th century, regional baking companies combined to form larger conglomerates, often known as Cracker Trusts. Of these, the largest was the National Biscuit Company that included 114 baking companies. It was incorporated in New Jersey in February 1898, and the company was later renamed Nabisco. Prior to modern securities law, it was not uncommon for companies to inflate the value of their assets. Nabisco, for example, was capitalized at $55,000,000, but its estimated value in real assets was less than $25,000,000. Writing in Moody's Magazine, John Moody referred to the $30,000,000 discrepancy as "water."
The Pacific Coast Biscuit Company was formed to compete against Nabisco. It was incorporated in New Jersey in May 1899, and included seven companies that together controlled most of the commercial biscuit and cracker business west of the Rocky Mountains. The companies, also known as the Cracker Trust, were 
 Portland Cracker Co. of Portland
 Oregon Cracker Co. of Portland
 Seattle Cracker and Candy Co. of Seattle
 Washington Cracker Co. of Spokane
 American Biscuit Co. of San Francisco
 Standard Biscuit Co. of San Francisco
 Southern California Cracker Co. of Los Angeles

Although the combined assets of the seven companies were valued at less than $1,000,000, capitalization was $4,000,000, and the United States Investor described the trust as "a stock jobbing scheme, whereby the operators hope to make a lot of money out of the investing public." 

Three of the subsidiaries, the Washington Cracker Company, the Oregon Cracker Company, and the Portland Cracker Company were owned by Herman Wittenberg, an entrepreneur specializing in biscuit and cracker company management.  Wittenberg started the Portland Cracker Company in 1886, and in the years thereafter he purchased several competing firms in Oregon and Washington. When Pacific Coast was organized, Wittenberg became vice president, and he remained in that office until the time of his death in 1912.

Swastika trade mark

In 1907 Pacific Coast began using a red swastika trademark in its marketing. In the early 20th century, swastika references in Pacific states were not unknown: for example, in 1914 the first cinema in Sausalito, California, opened under the name "Swastika Theatre". Pacific Coast's packaging was designed to mimic that of Nabisco, and Pacific Coast's swastika was similar in color and placement to Nabisco's in-er-seal trademark, although it did not resemble the shape of Nabisco's trademark.

Nabisco lawsuit
In 1914 Nabisco sued Pacific Coast in federal court for unfair competition and trademark infringement. The court found that Pacific Coast had engaged in unfair practices and issued an injunction barring the company from marketing several brands that were packaged similar to those of Nabisco, and the court ordered Pacific Coast to stop using its red swastika trademark. As a result of the court decision, Pacific Coast altered its packaging and redesigned its swastika.

In 1930 Nabisco purchased Pacific Coast Biscuit Company and continued to operate its brands, and the swastika was replaced by Nabisco's in-er-seal logo.

See also
 Pacific Coast Biscuit Company Building
 Oregon Cracker Company Building

References

Further reading
 Coombs and Batchelor,  We Are What We Sell: How Advertising Shapes American Life (ABC-CLIO, 2014)
 Swett, Selling under the Swastika: Advertising and Commercial Culture in Nazi Germany (Stanford University Press, 2013) How aspirations and anxieties are reflected in German advertising in the second, third, and fourth decades of the 20th century.

External links

 Pacific Coast Biscuit Company Photographic Collection circa 1900-1929
 Guide to the National Biscuit Company photograph album, 1900-1935
 The Washington Cracker Company
 Obituary of Herman Wittenberg in The Oregonian

1899 establishments in New Jersey
1930 disestablishments in Oregon
American companies established in 1899
Food manufacturers of the United States
Manufacturing companies based in Portland, Oregon
 
Snack food manufacturers of the United States
Food and drink companies based in Portland, Oregon
Food and drink companies established in 1899